Victory Road may refer to:
 TNA Victory Road, a professional wrestling event
 Victory Road (video game), a 1986 arcade game
 Victory Road, a street in Salt Lake City, Utah that is part of Utah State Route 186
 Victory Road (Pokémon), a location in the Pokémon video games

See also
 Road to Victory (disambiguation)`
 World Victory Road, Japanese MMA